Paramaledivibacter is a strictly anaerobic, slightly halophilic, non-spore-forming and moderately thermophilic genus of bacteria from the family of Peptostreptococcaceae with one known species (Paramaledivibacter caminithermalis).

References

Peptostreptococcaceae
Bacteria genera
Monotypic bacteria genera
Taxa described in 2016